The 2015–16 EuroLeague Women season is the 20th edition of EuroLeague Women under its current name.

Teams
Teams and seedings were unveiled by FIBA Europe on 3 July 2015.

Draw
17 teams registered for EuroLeague Women 2015–16, resulting in 15 direct qualifiers, and one preliminary round to be played between BK Brno and CB Avenida. However, on August 6, BK Brno announced its withdrawal from European competitions due to financial reasons, automatically qualifying Perfumerías Avenida to the Regular Season

Regular season

Regular season will start on October 14 and will finish on February 10, 2016.

The four top teams of each group will qualify to the quarterfinals.

If teams are level on record at the end of the Regular Season, tiebreakers are applied in the following order:
 Head-to-head record.
 Head-to-head point differential.
 Point differential during the Regular Season.
 Points scored during the regular season.
 Sum of quotients of points scored and points allowed in each Regular Season game.

Group A

Group B

Quarter-finals
Quarter-finals will be played on March 8, 11 and 16, 2016.

Final Four
The Final Four will be played on April 15 and 17, 2016.

All times are local (UTC+3).

Semifinals

Third place game

Final

Statistical leaders

Points

Rebounds

Assists

See also
 2015–16 EuroCup Women

References

External links

 
 FIBA Archive

 
EuroLeague Women seasons